Hans-Jürgen Gundelach (born 29 November 1963) is a German retired professional footballer who played as a goalkeeper.

Honours
Eintracht Frankfurt
 DFB-Pokal: 1987–88

Werder Bremen
 Bundesliga: 1992–93; runner-up: 1994–95
 DFB-Pokal: 1993–94

References

External links
 
 

1963 births
Living people
People from Main-Kinzig-Kreis
Sportspeople from Darmstadt (region)
German footballers
Association football goalkeepers
Germany under-21 international footballers
Bundesliga players
2. Bundesliga players
Eintracht Frankfurt players
FC 08 Homburg players
SV Werder Bremen players
West German footballers
Footballers from Hesse